Acacia flocktoniae is a shrub species that is endemic to Australia.

Plants grow to between 1.5 and 3 metres high and have narrow phyllodes that are between 4 and 10 cm long. The cream to yellow flower heads appear in racemes of 4 to 10 in the axils of the phyllodes. These appear predominantly between June and September in the species' native range and are followed by straight or slightly curved seed pods which are 4 to 11 cm long and 5 to 7 mm wide.

The species occurs on sandstone in dry sclerophyll forest in the Blue Mountains in New South Wales. It was first formally described in 1916 by New South Wales Government Botanist Joseph Maiden in Journal and Proceedings of the Royal Society of New South Wales, based on specimens collected from Byrnes Gap near Yerranderie. The species epithet honours botanical artist Margaret Flockton.

References

flocktoniae
Flora of New South Wales
Fabales of Australia